Karolína Majerníková, known professionally as Lina Mayer, is a Slovak singer and dancer.

Discography

Studio albums (solo)
2015: Lina Mayer - EP

Singles

References

External links
 
 
 Hudba.zoznam profile

1984 births
21st-century Slovak women singers
Living people
Musicians from Košice